On 21 November 1994, NATO aircraft taking part of Operation Deny Flight carried out an airstrike on the airbase of Udbina, Croatia, then part of the self-proclaimed Serbian Republic of Krajina. Krajina Serbs had been launching air attacks on neighbour Bosnia and Herzegovina from the base in support of allied Serbian forces there, specially during the battle of Bihac. NATO forces intervened in order to deter further attacks. Two anti-aircraft SA-2 missile sites that the Serbs had used to attack Bihac in the ground-to-ground mode and to engage NATO aircraft were also destroyed in the following days. The bombing of Udbina was the largest air combat operation in Europe since World War II, and the largest combat operation in NATO's history up to that time.

Bihac safe haven
In October and November 1994, allied Muslim-Croat forces launched a major offensive around the town of Bihać, in far northwestern Bosnia, which had been declared a safe zone for refugees by the UN. The Serbs soon launched a counterattack, and in support of their operations, they carried out air strikes with aircraft based at a former JNA military airport in Udbina, southwest of Bihać, within the boundaries of the Serbian Krajina.

Serb strikes
The Serb aircraft dropped napalm and cluster bombs on Bosnian positions at Bihac pocket. The majority of the sorties released their bombs without flying on Bosnia's air space, and the jets perfected the tactic of flying below the radar screen, but the attacks were a clear violation of the no-fly zone anyway, and a challenge to NATO.
The Krajina Serbs attacks began on 10 November on Cazin and Bihac itself, but these ones only involved the use of heavy artillery and SA-2 surface-to-air missiles in the ground-to-ground role.

On 18 November, two Orao planes dropped napalm and cluster bombs, while on the following day, other two aircraft launched four bombs on civilian facilities at Cazin. One of the jets, an Orao, was shot down and its pilot, identified as Boro Novic, was killed. Three of the bombs did not explode, but nine civilians lost their lives. Two Royal Air Force (RAF) Tornados pursued two Galeb after they attacked Bosnian positions around Bihac, but were forced to stop the chase when the Serb pilots crossed the Croatian border, where NATO forces had no mandate.

As a response to the deteriorating situation in Bihac,  the Security Council passed Resolution 958, which allowed NATO aircraft to operate over Croatia. On 21 November, NATO acted under its new authority by planning a strike on the Udbina airfield.

NATO airstrike
The attack on Udbina airfield was originally planned for 20 November, but the operation was aborted due to poor weather conditions.

On Monday 21 November, NATO eventually carried out what became the biggest air attack in its 45-year history. The operation involved 39 attack aircraft and another 16 in charge of pre-strike surveillance,  resupply, early warning, command and control, post-strike surveillance and electronic countermeasures. According to British sources, only French Air Force and RAF Jaguar fighters actually dropped bombs on the airbase and anti-aircraft sites in the area. The aircraft took off from five Italian air bases, and the airstrike lasted from 13:00 to 13:45 local time. F-16A Fighting Falcons from the Royal Netherlands Air Force provided protection to the strike force, while reconnaissance and electronic jamming was carried out by French Mirage 2000s, United States Air Force (USAF) EF-111 Ravens, F-15E Strike Eagles, F-16s and United States Marine Corps (USMC) F/A-18 Hornets.

The first targets to be engaged were the SA-6 battery and the anti-aircraft artillery defending the base. NATO fighters dropped cluster bombs on them. The Serb crews manning the equipment were alerted in advance, in order to avoid major casualties. Precision guided ordnance and gravity bombs were then used to strike the airfield. In a show of self-restraint, the bombers spared some 20 Serbian ground-attack aircraft parked on the runway's end.
A damage assessment at dusk revealed that the airstrip had been badly hit in five places. The commander of the Serb airbase, Colonel Ratko Dopudja, acknowledged the loss of two soldiers and several wounded.

Follow-up operations
On 22 November, two Royal Navy Sea Harriers from the carrier HMS Invincible were engaged by Serb anti-aircraft missiles. The British aircraft managed to outmaneuver the missiles and escaped unscathed.

The next day, NATO launched a reconnaissance air package including  RAF Jaguars, French Mirage 2000s and USAF F-16s to search the area. The air patrol was escorted by two U.S. Navy EA-6B Prowlers, armed with AGM-88 HARM anti-radiation missiles. When a Serb SA-2 radar from Otoka illuminated one of the surveillance aircraft, the EA-6Bs fired two HARMs at the anti-aircraft position. Both missiles hit home. A third missile was launched at a second SA-2 missile site at Dvor, in Croatia. After a damage assessment, Otoka's missile site was once again the subject of an airstrike later in the day when F-15E dropped GBU-12 laser-guided bombs on the area.

Aftermath
The airbase at Udbina was put out of commission for nearly a month. The air raid, however, had no immediate effect on the military situation on the ground around Bihac. On the contrary, the Bosnian 5th Bosnian Army Corps stopped their offensive and withdrew to their original positions, followed by thousands of refugees.

Elsewhere, Serb authorities reacted by taking 500 UNPROFOR hostages by early December, including three that were forced to remain on the tarmac of Banja Luka airstrip as human shields. Serb ground forces also continued to hampered NATO air patrols by locking down and firing anti-aircraft missiles at them; two RAF Tornados evaded radar-guided missiles on 24 November, while two F-16s were fired at the next day.

The Serb's seizing of hostages and the increasing harassment of their aircraft forced NATO to suspend flights over Bosnia and Croatia on 2 December. After former U.S. president Jimmy Carter brokered a four-month ceasefire agreement, NATO operations were scaled down and Serbs forces released all UNPROFOR hostages. Notwithstanding, NATO surveillance continued, and on 17 December a French navy Super Etendard from the aircraft carrier Foch was hit by a shoulder-launched anti-aircraft missile. The damaged fighter managed to return to Foch.

The airbase was eventually overrun by Croatian forces on 7 August 1995, during Operation Storm.

See also
 Banja Luka incident 
1995 Pale air strikes

References

NATO intervention in the former Yugoslavia
Conflicts in 1994
Airstrikes conducted by France
Airstrikes conducted by the United Kingdom
Airstrikes conducted by the United States